is a Japanese basketball player. He competed in the men's tournament at the 1956 Summer Olympics and the 1960 Summer Olympics.

References

1936 births
1983 deaths
Japanese men's basketball players
Olympic basketball players of Japan
Basketball players at the 1956 Summer Olympics
Basketball players at the 1960 Summer Olympics
Asian Games medalists in basketball
Asian Games bronze medalists for Japan
Medalists at the 1954 Asian Games
Medalists at the 1958 Asian Games
Basketball players at the 1954 Asian Games
Basketball players at the 1958 Asian Games